Live at the Symphony Hall is a live album by the English rock band Magnum, released in 2019 by SPV.

The album was recorded on 19 April 2018 at Birmingham's Symphony Hall, and is the first live album by Magnum to feature Rick Benton on keyboards and  Lee Morris on drums. It was also the first live album to feature Tobias Sammet as a guest vocalist, and the last with Al Barrow as bassist.

The album cover art is taken from that of the band's previous album Lost on the Road to Eternity, which was painted by Rodney Matthews.

Track listing

Personnel
Tony Clarkin – guitar
Bob Catley – vocals
Al Barrow – bass guitar
Rick Benton – keyboards
Lee Morris – drums
Tobias Sammet – vocals

Charts

References

2019 live albums
Magnum (band) live albums